Association football is the most popular sport in Bosnia and Herzegovina since after gaining independence from Yugoslavia in 1991, in 1995 they played their first international game against Albania, but they made the debut at the 2014 FIFA World Cup in Brazil, their first ever appearance in the tournament. The popular team that is supported is FK Sarajevo.

It is governed by the Football Association of Bosnia and Herzegovina governing body in country, the national team has never qualified for the UEFA European Championship after failing at the play-offs by three teams. The football governing body has the Premier League of Bosnia and Herzegovina and also the Bosnia and Herzegovina Football Cup. The teams also make the European international competitions like UEFA Champions League, UEFA Europa League and also the new UEFA Europa Conference League tournament.

National team of Bosnia and Herzegovina 

The team has only qualified for a major international tournament once as an independent nation, reaching the 2014 FIFA World Cup. It is yet to qualify for a UEFA European Championship, coming closest by losing to Portugal in the play-offs for UEFA Euro 2012.

Bosnia's home ground is Bilino Polje Stadium in the city of Zenica. The national team's first international victory as a FIFA member came against 1994 FIFA World Cup runners-up Italy on 6 November 1996. The national team's highest FIFA World Ranking was 13th in August 2013. October 2013 FIFA World Rankings, used to seed qualified teams in the 2014 FIFA World Cup Final Draw, placed Bosnia and Herzegovina as the highest ranked team of all former Yugoslav republics for the first time in history. In the past years, the national side finished twice among the top three best movers in FIFA World Ranking of the year. In their first game at their first World Cup, centre-forward Vedad Ibišević scored Bosnia's first ever goal at a major tournament in the country's history in a 1–2 loss to two-time World Cup winning opposition Argentina.

History of club competitions 
The game reached Bosnia and Herzegovina at the start of the 20th century, with Sarajevo (in 1903) and Mostar (in 1905) being the first cities to embrace it. Banja Luka, Tuzla, Zenica and Bihać were next along with numerous smaller towns as the sport spread. The country was under Austro-Hungarian rule when official competition began in 1908, though these activities were on a small scale within each territory. At the outbreak of World War I, there were four clubs in Sarajevo; SAŠK, Slavija, Đerzelez (also known as Sarajevski), and Makabi Sarajevo (also known as Barkohba)   and approximately 20 outside the capital. The creation of the Kingdom of Yugoslavia post 1918 brought an increase in the number of leagues, and soon a domestic national championship was organised. The Yugoslav football league system was based in numerous subassociations which served as competitions which determined the local representants of the subassociations in the national final stage, the Yugoslav championship. In 1920, the Sarajevo football subassociation was founded which included besides Sarajevo and its outskirts, also most of eastern Bosnia and western Serbia. The Banja Luka football subassociation included most of the western Bosnia and an area usually known as Krajina, while the Podrinje region souranding city of Bijeljina was part of the provincial leagues of the Belgrade football subassociation. The unified Yugoslav championship ran until the start of Secomd World War with 1939/40 season having been the last to have been completed. In this period 3 clubs from modern-day territory of Bosnia and Herzegovina managed to qualify for the final stages of the Yugoslav championships, SAŠK and Slavija, both from Sarajevo, and Krajišnik from Banja Luka. Many local players became targets of dominating teams and had successful careers such as Florijan Matekalo, Petar Manola, Milan Rajlić, Stanko Zagorac, Aleksandar Mastela or Branko Stanković.

The Football Federation of Bosnia and Herzegovina was founded after the Second World War, as the subdivision of the Yugoslav Football Association. The new communist authorities abolished the former league sistem and disbanded numerous clubs while created others. The era from 1945 till 1992 can be marked by the emergence of a highly competitive and quality league, characterized by the appearance of a chronical "Big 4" contenders for the title (Red Star, Patizan, Hajduk and Dinamo Zagreb) but with a particularity that highlights Bosnian football which is that their clubs were always present in the First League and FK Sarajevo, and Željezničar even won championships and created one of the most intense outsiders derbies at time, the Sarajevo derby.

Club football 
Bosnia and Herzegovina's best sides at the time of former Yugoslavia were Sarajevo, Željezničar (Sarajevo) and Velež (Mostar) which played in the Yugoslavian first league, second league and cup competitions with moderate success, while its best players with the likes of Vahid Halilhodžić, Safet Sušić, Josip Katalinski, Faruk Hadžibegić, Ivica Osim, Asim Ferhatović, Blaž Slišković, Mehmed Baždarević, Dušan Bajević and many others were chosen to represent SFR Yugoslavia national football team.

Other notable clubs that participate in Premier League of Bosnia and Herzegovina are HŠK Zrinjski Mostar, NK Čelik Zenica, NK Široki Brijeg, FK Sloboda Tuzla, as well as FK Borac Banja Luka.

Football stadiums in Bosnia and Herzegovina

Fans
Ultras are common there with the biggest names as Manijaci the supporter group of Željeznicar, Horde zla The supporter group of FK Sarajevo and the BHFanaticos the supporter group of the national side.

References

 

lt:Bosnijos ir Hercegovinos futbolo sistema